Jodhpur Institute of Engineering and Technology (JIET) is an engineering college in Jodhpur. It is a part of the JIET Group and was established in 2003. It is NAAC "A" grade accredited and accredited by NBA. JIET offers four-year Bachelor of Technology programmes in 6 branches of engineering, and four branches of M.Tech studies.

Notable alumni

See also
 List of universities and higher education colleges in Jodhpur

References

Engineering colleges in Jodhpur
Colleges in Jodhpur
Educational institutions established in 2003
2003 establishments in Rajasthan